Vale Real is a municipality in the state of Rio Grande do Sul, Brazil.

Personalities
Marthina Brandt – Miss Brasil 2015

See also
List of municipalities in Rio Grande do Sul

References

Municipalities in Rio Grande do Sul